Kanina may refer to places:

 Kanina, Poland, a village in Poland
 Kanina (Mělník District), a municipality and village in the Czech Republic
 Kanina Khas, a town in Haryana, India
 Kaninë, a settlement in Albania